Dominique van Dijk (born 5 September 1979) is a Dutch retired footballer who played as a midfielder.

Club career
Born in Groningen, Van Dijk came through the youth system of amateur side LTC Assen. He was picked up by FC Groningen at age 12, and made his first-team debut on 17 October 1998 against VVV-Venlo in the second division. He was signed by Cambuur Leeuwarden in summer 2001, making his debut in a 1–1 draw against HFC Haarlem in the Eerste Divisie on 17 August 2001.

He signed for Eredivisie side RKC Waalwijk in May 2005. He made his debut in a 2–1 win against his former club FC Groningen. He signed for Sparta Rotterdam in the 2006 transfer window. He eventually made his debut in a 1–2 defeat to Vitesse Arnhem on 18 August 2006. Van Dijk played 15 league matches for Sparta in the. He finished the 2006–07 season with 15 league appearances and 1 goal. He moved to fellow Eerste Divisie side Go Ahead Eagles on a free transfer in July, making his debut in a 6–0 win against FC Emmen, scoring two goals himself.

He was loaned out to FC Volendam in the 2008–09 season, and at the end of the season, he was signed permanently by the club.

Personal life
He is a son of former footballer and coach, Jan van Dijk, and older brother of fellow footballer Gregoor van Dijk. He started his own fashion brand, Leger des Stijls when still a football player.

References

External links
 Dominique van Dijk profile on VI.nl 

1979 births
Living people
Footballers from Groningen (city)
Association football midfielders
Dutch footballers
FC Groningen players
SC Cambuur players
RKC Waalwijk players
Sparta Rotterdam players
Go Ahead Eagles players
FC Volendam players
Eredivisie players
Eerste Divisie players
Dutch fashion designers